Daesil Station is a station of the Daegu Metro Line 2 in Jukgok-ri, Dasa-eup, Dalseong County, Daegu, South Korea. The Daesil or Sino-Korean word Jukgok (竹谷) means the bamboo village.

References

External links 
  Cyber station information from Daegu Metropolitan Transit Corporation

Daegu Metro stations
Dalseong County
Railway stations opened in 2005